Peru competed at the 1960 Summer Olympics in Rome, Italy. 31 competitors, all men, took part in 8 events in 3 sports. Peru returned to the football tournament once more after the controversial 1936 Olympics. Most of the athletes that represented Peru were part of the football squad. Peru also participated in shooting and rowing events.

Football

Only the team with the most points advanced to the Semifinals. Peru lost its first two matches against France and Hungary but won its third match against India which gave them two points

Group D

Squad

Head coach:  György Orth

Shooting

Pistol

Rifle

Rowing

Peru had two male rowers participate in one out of seven rowing events in 1960.

References

External links
Official Olympic Reports

Nations at the 1960 Summer Olympics
1960
1960 in Peruvian sport